Ilzaam is a 1986 Bollywood drama film directed by Shibu Mitra and produced by Pahlaj Nihlani, starring Govinda in his film debut alongside Neelam, Shatrughan Sinha, Anita Raj, Shashi Kapoor and Prem Chopra. The film was declared a hit at the box office.

Synopsis
Orphaned and poor Ajay (Govinda) meets with wealthy Aarti (Neelam), and both fall in love. Their hopes to marry are dashed to the ground, when Aarti's dad, Dhanraj (Prem Chopra), opposes Ajay and Aarti's marriage until he gets wealthy. Ajay disappears from Aarti's life, and Aarti is heartbroken but does not get Ajay out of her mind. Several months later, she meets with a young man who looks like Ajay, but claims that he is Vijay. She finds out that he is living with a sister, Laxmi, his mother, and an older brother, Inspector Suraj Prasad (Shatrughan Sinha) While investigating an unrelated matter, Suraj Prasad finds out that Vijay is a career criminal, who sings and dances on the streets, distracting people, while his colleagues break into apartments and rob the residents.

Cast

 Shashi Kapoor as Police Commissioner Ranjit Singh
 Shatrughan Sinha as Inspector Suraj Prasad 
 Govinda as Ajay 
 Neelam as Aarti
 Anita Raj as Kamal
 Ramesh Deo as Inspector Yadav
 Prem Chopra as Dhanraj
 Raj Kiran as Satish Singh
Gita Siddharth as Suraj Prasad's Mother 
Pinchoo Kapoor as Fakirchand
Tej Sapru as Shivaji Hall Manager and robbery gang leader
Manik Irani as Billa
 Sudhir as Rocky
 Mac Mohan as Macky
Satish Kaul as  Rahim Khan, Truck Driver
 Gurbachan Singh as henchman sent to kill Rahim driver
 Kedarnath Sehgal as Police Inspector interrogating Rahim khan
Shivraj as Kamal's Father
Shraddha Verma as Laxmi Prasad, Suraj Prasad's Sister

Soundtrack
Lyrics: Anjaan

References

External links 
 

1986 films
1980s Hindi-language films
Films scored by Bappi Lahiri
Films directed by Shibu Mitra
Indian drama films